Cawood is a village in North Yorkshire, England.

Cawood may also refer to:

Cawood, Kentucky, a census-designated place
 Cawood Bridge, a swing bridge which spans the River Ouse (York) in North Yorkshire, England
 Cawood Castle, a Grade I listed building in Cawood, the village in North Yorkshire, England
 Cawood sword, a medieval sword discovered in the River Ouse
 Cawood, Wistow and Selby Light Railway, railway in Yorkshire

People

Family name 
 Charlie Cawood (born 1988), English musician, composer and music journalist
 Dorothy Cawood (1884–1962), Australian WWI nurse awarded Military Medal
 Elize Cawood (1952–2020), South African actress
 John Cawood (printer) (1514–1572), English printer
 John C. Cawood ( 1926–1929), Australian administrator
 Sarah Cawood (born 1972), English television presenter

Given name 
 Cawood Ledford (1926–2001), American sportscaster

See also
Alleyn-et-Cawood
Arkholme-with-Cawood